SM&A, founded in 1982 as Steven Myers & Associates, is a defense and aerospace consulting firm located in Irvine, California.  The founder of SM&A is Steven Myers.  In 2008 Steven Myers sold the company to Odyssey Investment Partners, LLC and the name was shortened to simply SM&A.  The company is the world's largest provider of Competition Management services (business capture and proposal development). They provide business capture and proposal leadership, program management, systems engineering, and expert support to major industrial customers in the defense, homeland security, aerospace, information technology, telecommunications, healthcare, and professional services sectors.

History 
SM&A was founded in 1982 by Steven Myers and was incorporated in 1985 as Steven Myers & Associates, Inc. in California as a private company. The business began to grow under Ronald Reagan's implementation of further defense forces and technology during the Cold War. SM&A grew out of the need for new designs and programs called for in this era.

From 1990 to 1994, the company grew by 44%, despite previous speculation that the end of the Cold War would slow the growth of the defense sector. From 1995 to 1997, SM&A grew in terms of client diversification and infrastructure growth. The company now needed the capability to support over 40 proposals in a year along with proposal services. Their program services department grew heavily, accounting for 20% of the $37 million in revenue the company was bringing in.

SM&A became a publicly traded company under the name of Steven Myers & Associates, Inc. in 1998, with an opening stock price of $12. They then began acquiring companies, including Space Applications Corporation and StamiNet, Inc. After these two acquisitions, the named was once again changed to “SM&A Corporation.”

November 1998 finished off with another acquisition, this time of Decision Science Applications, whose name was changed to SM&A Corporation-East. In December 1998, recently acquired company Space Applications Corporation, changed its name to SM&A Corporation-East, and merged StamiNet into the new firm.

SM&A continued to acquire companies in 1999, including Systems Integration Software and Kapos Associates, Inc. The corporation also merged with Systems Integration Software, which became a wholly owned subsidiary of SM&A Corporation.

The early 2000s were filled with highs and lows. The corporation's name was changed once again, this time to “Emergent Information Technologies, Inc.” The company was forced to liquidate one of its 3 operating groups and disperse another in order to pay off debts. Emergent Information Technologies-East was sold to L3 Communications. The firm recovered and began supporting programs for high-value programs as well as extending their services to support engineering and other technical services.

In 2002, the corporation's name was changed again, from Emergent Information Technologies, Inc. to its present name, “SM&A.” The following year, it went public on the Nasdaq National Market and closed at $9.78.

SM&A was incorporated in Delaware in 2006, was reincorporated through the merger of SM&A California and into SM&A Delaware, leaving SM&A Delaware as the surviving company. The company then proceeded to acquire Project Planning, Inc. and performance Management Associates, Inc.

In 2007, Steve Myers retired and Cathy McCarthy took over.

SM&A also made several key acquisitions in 2010, including Project Planning, Inc., PMA, ifour, Black Ram Engineering, and Cardinal Technologies as it continued to grow and dominate the global proposal industry.

In July 2013, current CEO Ajay Patel took over the corporation. Today, SM&A is the largest consulting firm providing high value servies to federal contractors across the entire program lifecycle from market entry, to winning business, to profitable execution.

Awards 
1998 - SM&A Wins Statewide "Exemplary Employer of Older Workers Award" From California Governor Wilson's Task Force
2000 - SM&A won the USAF Experimentation Awards for funding under two contracts for continued support to the United States Air Force Experimentation program.

Press 
 Commentary: Should Free-Fall in Oil Prices Worry Exporters to the Gulf? (defensenews.com)
 SMA Associate Bill Fallon on CNN
 Iraq Roundtable Discussion featuring SMA Associate Bill Fallon
 National Security Threats featuring SMA Associate Bill Fallon (cspan.org)
 Aerospace, Defense, & Security breakfast briefing: "Winning Business in the Middle East and Asia" (bird&bird)
 SM&A Gets New Ownership and Leadership

References 

Companies based in Irvine, California
American companies established in 1982
Management consulting firms of the United States
1982 establishments in California